Tor Lars Oskar Endresen (born 15 June 1959 in Bergen) is a Norwegian singer and composer.

He has entered the Norwegian song selection for the Eurovision Song Contest numerous times, but has only won it once, and represented Norway in the Eurovision Song Contest 1997, where he finished in last place with nul points.

Endresen was part of a popular Norwegian TV show in the early 1990s, a show with pop music from the 1950s and 1960s called Lollipop, as a singing bartender. The show went on for 30 episodes, and there were released three albums (English lyrics) with music from the show which sold very well in Norway.

A single called "Black Rain" which was released from his album Call Me Stranger in 1986, was nearly chosen as the themesong for the James Bond film The Living Daylights in 1987. (The choice fell on the Norwegian group a-ha instead.)

He has been awarded two film music awards from Disney for his singing contribution to the Norwegian version of Disney films.

Hits
1992 "Radio Luxembourg"
1991 "Ingen er så nydelig som du"

Discography

Album
 2013 – Jumping For Joy
 2005 – Now And Forever
 2004 – Retrofeelia
 2001 – Julen i våre hjerter (Christmas album with daughter Anne Sophie)
 2001 – Trippel Tor (CD-box) (reissue of Solo, Tor Endresen II and Sanger)
 2000 – Blue
 1999 – Tarzan – Norwegian original film music
 1998 – Nære ting (with Rune Larsen)
 1997 – De aller beste (collection)
 1996 – Sanger
 1995 – Det beste fra Lollipop (collection)
 1992 – Tor Endresen II
 1992 – Collection (with Pål Thowsen) ((collection))
 1991 – Lollipop Jukebox (with Rune Larsen, Carola, Karoline Krüger and The Lollipops)
 1991 – Solo
 1990 – Lollipop 2 (with Rune Larsen and The Lollipops)
 1989 – Lollipop (with Rune Larsen)
 1989 – Life Goes On (with Pål Thowsen)
 1986 – Call Me Stranger (with Pål Thowsen) (includes Ole Edvard Antonsen)

Melodi Grand Prix
 2015 – "All over the world" with Elisabeth Andreassen
 2006 – "Dreaming of a new tomorrow" (5th)
 2005 – "Can you hear me" (with the group Seppo – 5th)
 1999 – "Lover" (3rd)
 1997 – "San Francisco" (1st)
 1994 – "Aladdin" (2nd)
 1993 – "Hva" (3rd)
 1992 – "Radio Luxembourg" (2nd)
 1990 – "Café le swing" (3rd)
 1989 – "Til det gryr av dag" (2nd)
 1988 – "Lengt" (4th)
 1987 – "Hemmelig drøm" (9th)

Eurovision Song Contest
 1997 – "San Francisco" (24th and last)
 1988 – "For Vår Jord" – Backing singer for Karoline Krüger

Charts

See also
Eurovision Song Contest
Eurovision Song Contest 1997
Melodi Grand Prix

References

External links

Tor Endresen – "Black Rain" at the media company Towerfilm's YouTube profile

1959 births
Living people
Melodi Grand Prix contestants
Eurovision Song Contest entrants for Norway
Eurovision Song Contest entrants of 1997
Musicians from Bergen
Melodi Grand Prix winners
Norwegian male singers
English-language singers from Norway
People educated at Langhaugen Upper Secondary School